The Pi Sigma Fraternity is a socio-political fraternity based in the University of the Philippines Diliman. The fraternity commits itself to the principles of "Paglingkuran ang Sambayanan (Serve the People)" and "Paragon of Scholarship". Its members call themselves Paragons.

Pi Sigma was founded on August 15, 1972 by eight UP students at the Molave Residence Hall of the UP Diliman campus.

The Pi Sigma Delta Sorority is its counterpart socio-political sorority founded on January 26, 1975. Besides pursuing similar principles and objectives, the sorority aids in the overall women's movement for liberation.

Notable members 
 Dong Abay - musician and poet
 Raymund Basilio - secretary-general of Alliance of Concerned Teachers (ACT) partylist
 Arnel Casanova - former president and CEO of the Bases Conversion Development Authority
 Edwin Laguerder - Mindanao-based youth and farmer's group organizer honored at the Bantayog ng mga Bayani for fighting against the Marcos dictatorship
 Francisco Nemenzo, Jr. - 18th president of the University of the Philippines
 Terry Ridon - former Kabataan Partylist representative and urban poor commissioner
 Raul Roco - former senator and former education secretary

See also 
 List of fraternities and sororities in the Philippines

References

Fraternities and sororities in the Philippines
Student organizations established in 1972
1972 establishments in the Philippines